Francis Hutcheson may refer to:

Francis Hutcheson (philosopher) (1694–1746), Scottish philosopher
Francis Hutcheson (songwriter) (1721–1784), Irish composer and physician

See also
Frank Hutchison (1891–1945), American blues musician
Francis Hutchinson (disambiguation)